The 2009 General Cup was an invitational professional snooker tournament that took place between 13–17 July 2009 at the General Snooker Club in Hong Kong.

Ricky Walden won in the final 6–2 against Liang Wenbo.

Prize fund
The breakdown of prize money for this year is shown below:
Winner: $20,000
Runner-up: $10,000
Semi-final: $7,500
Players 5–7: $5,000
Highest break: $5,000
Maximum break: $100,000

Group stage

Group 1

 
 Liang Wenbo 4–2 Chan Wai Kei
 Ricky Walden 4–3 Chan Wai Kei
 Ricky Walden 1–4 Liang Wenbo

Group 2

 Marco Fu 4–2 Li Yan
 Tian Pengfei 2–4 Li Yan
 Marco Fu 1–4 Tian Pengfei

Preliminary round
 Zhang Anda 2–4 Li Yan

Knock-out stage

Final

Century breaks

116, 104  Liang Wenbo
111, 104  Ricky Walden
105, 100  Li Yan

References

2009
2009 in Hong Kong sport
2009 in snooker